Craig Philip Bohl (born July 27, 1958) is an American college football coach and former player, currently the head football coach at the University of Wyoming. He was previously the head coach at North Dakota State University in Fargo from 2003 to 2013, where he led the Bison to three consecutive NCAA Division I Football Championships in his final three seasons.

Early years
Born in Lincoln, Nebraska, Bohl was a reserve defensive back for the Nebraska Cornhuskers from 1977 to 1979. He earned a bachelor's degree in business from the University of Nebraska–Lincoln in 1982.

Coaching career

Assistant coaching
Bohl was an assistant coach for many different programs for 19 years, including at his alma mater Nebraska for eight seasons, the last three as defensive coordinator. He was a coach for two national championship teams at Nebraska, in 1995 and 1997.

North Dakota State
Bohl was hired as head coach at NDSU in 2003. As its 32nd head football coach, he guided the storied program as it transitioned from Division II, where they had won eight national championships, to Division I. Four years after completing the move, he led the Bison to their first ever FCS Championship title in 2011, beating Sam Houston State 17-6 in the final. On January 1, 2013, North Dakota State gave Bohl an eight-year contract extension through the 2020 season, and four days later, he rewarded them by leading the Bison to their second consecutive FCS Championship, defeating Sam Houston State again, 39-13.

In the 2013 season opener on August 30, NDSU upset defending Big 12 champion Kansas State 24‑21. Bohl won more games than any other NDSU head football coach; he surpassed Rocky Hager on September 21 with his 92nd win.

On Saturday, January 4, 2014, he led the Bison to their third straight FCS football championship, downing Towson 35-7. The Bison were the second team in FCS history to three straight national championships, after Appalachian State (2005–2007).

Wyoming
Bohl was hired at Wyoming of the Mountain West Conference in December 2013 and took over in January, after leading North Dakota State to the 2013 FCS title.

Following two difficult seasons with a combined record of 6–18 (4–12 in conference play), Bohl's Cowboys went 8–4 (6–2 in conference play) to win the Mountain Division in 2016. On November 29, 2016, Bohl was selected as the Mountain West Conference Coach of the Year. On the eve of Wyoming's first conference championship game in twenty years, Wyoming gave Bohl a contract extension through 2023. Wyoming was invited to their first bowl game in five seasons at the end of the 2016 season, the 2016 Poinsettia Bowl, losing to BYU, 24–21.

In 2017, Wyoming again finished with a winning record, and were invited to the 2017 Famous Idaho Potato Bowl, defeating Central Michigan 37–14. This marked the first time since the 1987-86 seasons that Wyoming had played in bowl games in consecutive years. Wyoming reached bowl eligibility in 2018 and 2019, and were invited to the 2019 Arizona Bowl, defeating Georgia State 38–17.

In 2020, Bohl again received a contract extension, this time through the 2024 season.

Head coaching record

References

External links
 Wyoming profile

1958 births
Living people
American football defensive backs
Duke Blue Devils football coaches
Nebraska Cornhuskers football coaches
Nebraska Cornhuskers football players
North Dakota State Bison football coaches
Rice Owls football coaches
Tulsa Golden Hurricane football coaches
Wisconsin Badgers football coaches
Wyoming Cowboys football coaches
Sportspeople from Lincoln, Nebraska
Coaches of American football from Nebraska
Players of American football from Nebraska